Montolieu is a commune in the Aude department in southern France.

Sometimes referred to as "Village of Books", Montolieu contains fifteen bookshops, mostly specializing in second-hand and antiquarian books. Many artists also live and work in Montolieu, with five workshops and galleries of painters and sculptors and three photographers' studios. It also contains a substantial cactus garden, the Cactuseraie d'Escaïre-Figue.
In 1989, Michel Braibant, a bookbinder in Carcassonne, initiated the Village of the Book in Montolieu. He created the Association "Montolieu Village du Livre", and founded the Arts and Crafts Museum of the Book.
Starting in 1991, bookshops and craftspersons of the book such as bookbinders and calligraphers set up shop in Montolieu.
A museum is created, le "Musée des Arts et Métiers du Livre"
The Paper Mill in Brousse is restored and reactivated.
Periodical cultural events are organized, such as "The Spring of Books", "Lire en Fête" and "Cuvée spéciale"
Nearly fifty buildings were renovated, and about fifteen beds and breakfast progressively opened up.
In 1992, Montolieu reopened its primary school.

Each year, Montolieu welcomes over 52,000 visitors. Additionally, 2,000 students from primary and high schools discover Montolieu's workshops.
Today, Montolieu offers the following:
Used and antiquarian bookshops
Working craftspeople of books and art.
The Arts and Crafts of the Book Museum.
Graphic and plastic art galleries and expositions.
Bibliophilia stocks.
Educational activities around the Book and its craft.
Many artists, sculptors, painters, photographers and musicians.
A heritage classified as historical monument.
An intermunicipal tourism office, from the Cabardes to the Canal du Midi.

Since its creation, Montolieu Village du Livre has facilitated the continuation and development of many shops and services, allowing its economy and employment to thrive.
These include bars, restaurants, coffee shops and bed-and-breakfast places, a market place, a tobacco/newspaper store, a baker, a hairdresser, a pre-school and a primary school, doctors and a drugstore, a swimming pool, a campsite, tennis courts, a soccer field, some organic farmers, and an organic vegetable vending machine, and fifteen  bookstores, seven artists' workshops and seven craftspeople of the book. Currently, the population of the village is eight hundred.

Population

See also
List of medieval bridges in France
Communes of the Aude department

References

External links

Official website

Communes of Aude
Aude communes articles needing translation from French Wikipedia